The 13th General Assembly of Nova Scotia represented Nova Scotia between 1826 and 1830.

The assembly sat at the pleasure of the Governor of Nova Scotia, James Kempt. After Kempt was named Governor of British North America in 1828, Thomas N. Jeffrey became governor for Nova Scotia.

Samuel George William Archibald was chosen as speaker for the house.

List of members

Notes:

References
Journal and proceedings of the House of Assembly, 1827 (1827)

Terms of the General Assembly of Nova Scotia
1826 in Canada
1827 in Canada
1828 in Canada
1829 in Canada
1830 in Canada
1826 establishments in Nova Scotia
1830 disestablishments in Nova Scotia